Warwick Hotel may refer to:

 National Hotel, Warwick, a heritage-listed hotel at 35 Grafton Street, Warwick, Queensland, Australia
 Langham Hotel, Warwick, a heritage-listed hotel at 133 Palmerin Street, Warwick, Queensland, Australia
 Criterion Hotel, Warwick, a heritage-listed hotel at 84 Palmerin Street in Warwick, Queensland, Australia
 Warwick Hotel (Toronto), a hotel in Toronto, Ontario, Canada
 The Warwick, a historic hotel in the Rittenhouse Square neighborhood of Philadelphia, Pennsylvania, US
 Warwick New York Hotel, a luxury hotel in Midtown Manhattan, New York City, US
 Warwick Hotels and Resorts, a global hospitality company headquartered in New York, US
 Hotel Warwick, a historic hotel building in Newport News, Virginia, US
 Warwick Allerton - Chicago, a hotel skyscraper in Chicago, Illinois, US